Lessard Lake is a lake in Alberta.

See also
List of lakes of Alberta

References

Lac Ste. Anne County
Lessard Lake